Beyond Jericho was a short-lived online extension of the CBS series Jericho. It was meant to take the form of a series of short "mini-episodes" that could be viewed on the official website, however only one episode was released on September 21, 2006, acting as a companion to the Pilot. The episode can only be viewed in the United States.

Episode synopsis

The first installment of Beyond Jericho began with an unknown man calling someone on a cell phone, requesting a ransom of $1.2 million for a woman he kidnapped.  He then disappears underground through a metal trap door.  While climbing down, he hears and feels a bang, but thinks nothing of it.

After conversing with an associate about their next plans, he picks the woman up and climbs back up to the roof.  When he opens the door, it's surrounded by rubble.  The entire city around them has been destroyed.  Shortly after, rubble falls through the trap door.

With the cell phone (apparently the victim's cell phone) dead, and assuming that the man's associate is dead as well in the collapse, they start to climb through the rubble to find out what happened.  Nearby, a hand with a surgical glove on emerges from the rubble as the vignette ends.

Production and cancellation

In an online interview, executive producer Carol Barbee announced that there would be a "digital connection" to Jericho through an online companion at Jericho's official site with mini-episodes featured on CBS.com's Innertube featuring the "other survivors" of the nuclear attacks outside of Jericho's primary setting of Jericho, Kansas.  According to Barbee, the story was to be unique to the site, but as the season of Jericho continued, it would have dovetailed into the episodes themselves.

Beyond Jericho was also promoted via commercial at the end of the first of the TV series episode on CBS.  However, the second episode only featured a commercial referencing the opportunity to watch Jericho online.  No further episodes of Beyond Jericho have appeared and the link to the first episode is no longer located on CBS's or Jericho's official websites.

Countdown

Beyond Jericho was replaced by a successor series: Countdown, which documents Robert Hawkins' efforts to learn as much as possible about the effects of nuclear bombs. It premiered on October 26, 2006, in conjunction with the episode "9:02"

External links

Jericho (2006 TV series) episodes